Huiji Temple is a Buddhist temple located in Pukou District of Nanjing, Jiangsu, China.

History

Southern and Northern dynasties
Originally built in the Southern and Northern dynasties (420–589), the temple was called "Tangquan Chanyuan".

Song dynasty
In the early Song dynasty (960–1276), the temple was renamed "Huiji Yuan". During the reign of Emperor Shenzong (1048–1085), Zhaoqing settled at the temple. At the same time, Sun Jue, Qin Guan and monk Canliao visited the temple and Qin Guan wrote a famous article named A Record of Touring Tangquan.

Ming dynasty
After the establishment of the Ming dynasty (1368–1644), Hongwu Emperor toured Tangquan Town where the temple located. Due to the social taboo of "Tang", its name was changed to "Xiangquan Temple".

Qing dynasty
During the Xianfeng era (1851–1861) of the Qing dynasty (1644–1911), the temple was badly damaged in the war between the Qing army and Taiping Rebellion. Then the temple was restored in the Guangxu period (1871–1908).

People's Republic of China
A large-scale reconstruction began in 2014.

Ginkgo tree
There are three millennial ginkgo trees in the temple.

References

External links
 

Buddhist temples in Nanjing
Buildings and structures in Nanjing
Tourist attractions in Nanjing
19th-century establishments in China
19th-century Buddhist temples